Village Cinema is a television movie network, owned by local diversified investment holding company, Demco Group, under brand license from Village Roadshow. It debuted in Greece on June, 11th 2012 exclusively on Cosmote TV via Conn-x (IPTV service) and Cosmote TV via Satellite.

The channel features movies, blockbusters and exclusive premieres by Village Cinemas. Also, it features programs focusing on movie production and the filmmaking space. The channel began broadcasting with the premiere of the film Buried which debuted on Greek television.

See also
Village Cinemas
Village Roadshow
OTE

References

External links
Official site

Television channels and stations established in 2012
Greek-language television stations
Television channels in Greece